UGC 6093 is a barred spiral galaxy located approximately 500 million light years (or about 153 megaparsecs)  away from Earth in the constellation of Leo.

This galaxy is known to host an active galactic nucleus, which is caused by the accretion of matter by a supermassive black hole located at its center, thus causing it to emit huge amounts of radiation and making UGC 6093's core shine excessively.  This galaxy is also a megamaser, which means that it acts as a giant astronomical laser generating microwaves rather than visible light.

References

Barred spiral galaxies
6093
Leo (constellation)